John Bowie Gordon  (23 July 1921 – 17 March 1991), known as Peter Gordon, was a New Zealand politician of the National Party.

Biography
Gordon was born in Stratford in 1921 to Stratford doctors William and Doris Gordon. Like his two brothers, he attended St Andrew's College, Christchurch, where he was a boarder from 1935 to 1937. He then attended Lincoln College and the Nuffield School in farming in Crookston, Minnesota.

In World War II, he was a flight lieutenant and pilot for the Royal New Zealand Air Force. After the war, he was a farmer and joined many organisations, where he had leading roles with the West Otago A & P Association (president), Farmers' Mutual Insurance (director, 1952–1960), and Shaw, Savill & Company (member of the New Zealand Advisory Board, 1956–1960).

With Robert Muldoon and Duncan MacIntyre he was one of the three 'Young Turks' of the National Party, a "ginger group" who entered Parliament in 1960.

In 1966 the Prime Minister at the time Keith Holyoake promoted Gordon to the Cabinet, along with several other backbenchers including future Prime Minister Robert Muldoon. In the Second National Government under Keith Holyoake, he was made Minister of Railways (1966–1972), Minister of Transport (1966–1972), and Minister of Civil Aviation (1966–1968). He maintained the transport and railways portfolios under Jack Marshall in 1972, and was made Minister of Marine and Fisheries.

In the Third National Government under Muldoon, Gordon was from 1975 Minister of Labour and Minister of State Services until his retirement in 1978. He was made a Privy Councillor in 1978, and a Companion of the Queen's Service Order for public services in the 1990 New Year Honours. He died in 1991.

Notes

References

|-

|-

1921 births
1991 deaths
New Zealand National Party MPs
Members of the Cabinet of New Zealand
People from Stratford, New Zealand
New Zealand World War II pilots
Companions of the Queen's Service Order
Lincoln University (New Zealand) alumni
Members of the New Zealand House of Representatives
New Zealand MPs for South Island electorates
People educated at St Andrew's College, Christchurch
20th-century New Zealand politicians
New Zealand members of the Privy Council of the United Kingdom
University of Minnesota Crookston alumni
New Zealand expatriates in the United States